Sarastan (also Romanized as Sarāstān; also known as Sar Āstān-e Do) is a village in Dehpir-e Shomali Rural District, in the Central District of Khorramabad County, Lorestan Province, Iran. At the 2006 census, its population was 20, in 6 families.

References 

Towns and villages in Khorramabad County